Several different minor league baseball teams were based in Salisbury, North Carolina, between 1905 and 1968.

The first was the Salisbury-Spencer Twins, who represented both Salisbury and Spencer, North Carolina, and operated in the Virginia-North Carolina League for part of the 1905 season before moving to Winston-Salem, North Carolina, and becoming the Winston-Salem Twins.

Piedmont League
The Salisbury Colonials joined the Piedmont League in 1926, and became the Salisbury-Spencer Colonials the following season. They won the Piedmont League championship in 1927 and lasted through 1929.

Franchise History

Salisbury Bees
The Salisbury Bees played in the Carolina Baseball League in 1935 and 1936 before becoming a Class-D affiliate of the Boston Braves in 1937 and joining the North Carolina State League. They were managed by Blackie Carter in both 1937 and 1938 and finished fifth in the league both years.

Salisbury Giants
The New York Giants took over the affiliation agreement in 1939 and changed the name Salisbury Giants. Under manager Johnnie Heving they won the NC State League title in 1941. This version of the team suspended operations in 1942 because of World War II.

Salisbury Pirates
The Salisbury Pirates were a North Carolina State League baseball team based in Salisbury, North Carolina, USA, that played from 1945 to 1952 and who were affiliated with the Pittsburgh Pirates from 1945 to 1951.

Salisbury Rocots
In 1953, as a Boston Red Sox affiliate known as the Salisbury Rocots, they played for one season in the Tar Heel League under manager Sheriff Robinson and finished in 8th place in the league.

Salisbury Braves
The Salisbury Braves were a minor league baseball team in Salisbury, North Carolina, during the 1960–1962 seasons. They played in the Western Carolinas League and were affiliates of the Houston Colt .45s in 1961, and the New York Mets in 1962.

Year-by-year record

Salisbury Dodgers
The Salisbury Dodgers were a minor league baseball team from Salisbury, North Carolina. They played in the Western Carolinas League as an affiliate of the Los Angeles Dodgers during the 1963 and 1964 seasons. They were managed by George Scherger and won the league championship in 1964.

Salisbury Astros
The Salisbury Astros, a Houston Astros affiliate, succeeded the Dodgers and played in 1965 and 1966. On June 19, 1965, the team took over first place in the Western Carolinas League after winning a game pitched by prospect Jay Dahl. That night, Dahl was riding in a car with pitcher Gary Marshall and a female passenger. The car crashed, Dahl was killed and Marshall was blinded due to severe eye injuries. The 1965 team won its league with a 70–48 win–loss record. The team featured several future major league players, including Bob Watson, who hit 12 home runs. The 1966 team struggled to a 44-77 record.

Salisbury Senators
The Washington Senators took over the affiliation agreement in 1968 and the Salisbury Senators The Senators were last in the six-team league, 20 games worse than #5 Rock Hill. The poor play of Salisbury enabled 4 of the 5 other teams to have winning percentages over .550. The club went 17-41 in the first half and 17-46 in the second half under Billy Klaus. 24,072 fans showed up, putting them fifth in attendance. Unsurprisingly, the team had no All-Stars. They were last in offense (474 runs), hitting .224 overall, and allowed over 200 more runs than Rock Hill, giving up 808 (team ERA of 5.34).

Notable Salisbury alumni

 Jack Billingham (1962) MLB All-Star

 Bobby Del Greco (1950)
 Tom Grieve (1968)

 Don Heffner (1929)

 Johnnie Heving (1942)

 Bob Hooper (1942) 

 Jerry Johnson (1962)

 Buck Jordan (1925–1926)

 Fred Stanley (1966)

 Bob Watson (1965) 2 × MLB All-Star

References

External links
Baseball Reference

Houston Astros minor league affiliates
Los Angeles Dodgers minor league affiliates
New York Mets minor league affiliates
Boston Red Sox minor league affiliates
New York Giants minor league affiliates
Boston Braves minor league affiliates
Houston Colt .45s minor league affiliates
Washington Senators (1961–1971) minor league affiliates
Defunct minor league baseball teams
Professional baseball teams in North Carolina
Defunct Western Carolinas League teams
1968 disestablishments in North Carolina
Defunct baseball teams in North Carolina
Baseball teams established in 1905
Baseball teams disestablished in 1968